David English may refer to:

David English (cricketer) (1946–2022), British cricketer, actor, writer and music manager, creator of The Bunbury Tails
Sir David English (editor) (1931–1998), British newspaper editor (Daily Mail, 1971–92)
David English (hurler), Irish hurler
Melvin Franklin (David Melvin English, 1942–1995), American bass singer